Redemption is a six-part crime drama television series created by Sean Cook. A co-commission between Virgin Media Television and ITV, the series premiered on Virgin Media One in Ireland on 18 April 2022.

Cast

Main

 Paula Malcomson as Colette Cunningham
 Abby Fitz as Cara Lockley
 Scott Graham as Ross Corby
 Thaddea Graham as Siobhán Wilson
 Ian Lloyd Anderson as Niall Kilduff
 Evan O'Connor as Liam Lockley
 Keith McErlean as Patrick Fannon
 Moe Dunford as Eoin Molony
 Siobhán McSweeney as Jane Connolly

Supporting
 Patrick Martins as Luke Byrne
 Sean Hughes as Kevin Cheng
 Jade Jordan as Debbie Gleeson
 Sean Duggan as Sean Kinsella
 Rachel O'Byrne as Stacey Lockley

Episodes

Production
Created by Sean Cook, Redemption is a co-production between ITV's Tall Story Pictures and the Irish company Metropolitan Films in association with Screen Ireland. Executive producers include Catherine Oldfield and Patrick Schweitzer with John Wallace and Ingrid Goodwin as producers and John Hayes as director. Noel Farragher and Susan E. Connolly completed the writers' room.

Cast members such as Paula Malcomson, Moe Dunford, Siobhán McSweeney, Keith McErlean, Thaddea Graham, and Ian Lloyd Anderson were announced in April 2021, by which point principal photography was underway.

References

External links
 
 Redemption at Virgin Media Television

2022 Irish television series debuts
BritBox original programming
ITV crime dramas
Virgin Media Television (Ireland) original programming